Lewis Chessum (born 27 February 2003) is an English rugby union player. He plays as a lock for Leicester Tigers and has captained the England under-20 rugby union team.

Early life
Chessum is from Lincolnshire. He was brought up in Aunsby, near Sleaford. He attended Carre's Grammar School.

Career
Chessum started playing rugby at Sleaford RFC when he was nine years-old. He joined Leicester Tigers rugby academy as a teenager in 2009. Chessum plays in the second-row where he can utilise his 6'7" height. He made his debut for Leicester in the 2021-22 season, after a loan at Championship Rugby side Nottingham. He was announced to have signed a new contact with Leicester in August 2022.

Chessum made his debut for England under-20s on March 1, 2022 in a win against Wales under-20s. He captained the England under-20 team for the first time, against Scotland under-20s in February 2023, England won the game 41-36.

Personal life
He is the younger brother of full England rugby union international Ollie Chessum. His mother is called Michelle and he also has a younger brother called Dylan.

References

2003 births
Living people
English rugby union players
Leicester Tigers players
Nottingham R.F.C. players
Rugby union locks
Rugby union players from Boston, Lincolnshire